Should Tall Men Marry? is a 1928 American short silent comedy film featuring Stan Laurel. It was his final solo film before he took up his celebrated partnership with Oliver Hardy permanently.

Plot
Joe Skittle is a successful rancher out West, although one who is unanimously disliked by his own livestock.
An ornery mule especially dislikes him and attacks him at every opportunity.

Skittle's daughter has two suitors, a shy cowpoke and villain Snake-tail Sharkey, who is described as "so two faced he needs two barbers to shave him".

Meek ranch hand Texas Tommy is assigned the unenviable task of holding off Sharkey and his gang single-handed, to
buy time for the daughter get married. Texas Tommy somehow accomplishes this feat, only to have Skittle claim credit for the capture. The mule responds to this lie by chasing Skittle into the sunset.

Cast
 James Finlayson as Joe Skittle
 Martha Sleeper as Martha Skittle
 Theodore von Eltz as Teddy (as Teddy von Eltz)
 Stuart Holmes as Snake-tail Sharkey
 Stan Laurel as Texas Tommy
 Edgar Dearing as Henchman (uncredited)
 Lew Meehan as Henchman (uncredited)

See also
 List of American films of 1928
 Stan Laurel filmography

References

External links

1928 films
American silent short films
American black-and-white films
1928 comedy films
1928 short films
Films directed by Louis J. Gasnier
Silent American comedy films
American comedy short films
1920s American films